The 2018–19 Denver Pioneers women's basketball represent the University of Denver in the 2018–19 NCAA Division I women's basketball season. The Pioneers, led second year head coach Jim Turgeon, play their home games at Hamilton Gymnasium with 1 game at Magness Arena and were members of The Summit League. They finished the season 18–14, 10–6 in Summit League play to finish in a tie for third place. They lost in the quarterfinals of the Summit League women's tournament to North Dakota. They received an automatic bid to the Women's National Invitation Tournament where defeated New Mexico in the first before losing to Idaho in the second round.

Roster

Schedule

|-
!colspan=9 style=| Exhibition

|-
!colspan=9 style=| Non-conference regular season

|-
!colspan=9 style=| Summit League regular season

|-
!colspan=9 style=| Summit League Women's Tournament

|-
!colspan=9 style=| WNIT

See also
2018–19 Denver Pioneers men's basketball team

References

Denver Pioneers women's basketball seasons
Denver
Denver Pioneers
Denver Pioneers
Denver